The Col de Cou (also spelled Col de Coux) (1,921 m) is a high mountain pass of the Alps, located on the border between Switzerland and France. It connects Champéry in the Swiss canton of Valais to Morzine in the French department of Haute-Savoie. It is the lowest border crossing between the Pas de Morgins and the Dents du Midi.

References

External links
Col de Cou on Hikr

Mountain passes of Switzerland
Mountain passes of the Alps
Mountain passes of Valais
France–Switzerland border crossings
Mountain passes of Auvergne-Rhône-Alpes